= Julio Tomás Martínez =

Julio Tomás Martínez (1878–1954) was a Puerto Rican painter, architect, engineer and educator. He was a painter of surrealist art.
